The Slingsby T.24 Falcon 4 was a two-seat training glider designed in the UK just after World War II for ATC use.  It was judged too expensive for production and only three were completed.

Development

Despite the shared name, the Slingsby Falcon 4 was a completely different aircraft from the early Falcon 1, 2 and 3, all derived from the Schleicher Falke from about 1930 and notable for their swept wings.  In contrast, the Falcon 4 was a tandem seat training glider intended for an ATC role and built to Air Ministry specification TX.8/45. It used conventional wooden construction; all three Falcon 4s were built by Martin Hearn Ltd. of Hooton Park, Cheshire.

The wing of the Falcon 4 was of quite low aspect ratio, with a straight, unswept leading edge, rounded copper bound tips and straight taper on the trailing edge.  The first two aircraft had flaps extending over almost all the trailing edge not occupied by the ailerons, but the third replaced flaps with spoilers. The wings were pylon mounted with lift struts from the spar to the lower fuselage longerons.  The pylon only extended forward to the spar, leaving space for the rear, open, cockpit under the wing; the forward cockpit was close to the nose. Behind the wing the pylon dropped away gently above the flat sided fuselage to the tail. The braced, straight tapered tailplane was mounted on top of the fuselage and placed far enough forward that the divided elevators were ahead of the rudder hinge, avoiding the need for a large cut out for rudder movement.  The fin was small, but the horn balanced rudder was generous in area,  slightly pointed and with a rounded, copper bound trailing edge. The undercarriage was conventional, with a nose skid, fixed monowheel and small tailwheel.

The first flight was in April 1946 and two other prototypes followed, but the aircraft was expensive to produce and no orders resulted.

Specifications

Notes

References

1940s British sailplanes
Falcon 4
Aircraft first flown in 1946
Parasol-wing aircraft